The Kline–Fogleman airfoil or KF airfoil is a simple airfoil design with single or multiple steps along the length of the wing. It was originally devised in the 1960s for paper airplanes.

In the 21st century the KF airfoil has found renewed interest among hobbyist builders of radio-controlled aircraft, due to its simplicity of construction. But it has not been adopted for full-size aircraft capable of carrying a pilot, passengers, or other substantial payloads.

History 
The KF airfoil was designed by Richard Kline and Floyd Fogleman. 

In the early 1960s, Richard Kline wanted to make a paper airplane that could handle strong winds, climb high, level off by itself and then enter a long downwards glide. After many experiments he was able to achieve this goal.  He presented the paper airplane to Floyd Fogleman who saw it fly and resist stalling. The two men then filed for a patent on the stepped airfoil.

Further development resulted in two patents and a family of airfoils known as the KF airfoil and KFm airfoils (for Kline–Fogleman modified). The two patents, US Patent # 3,706,430 and US Patent # 4,046,338, refer to the introduction of a step on either the bottom (KFm1) or the top (KFm2) of an airfoil, or on both the top and bottom (KFm4). Variations include airfoils with two steps on the top (KFm3), or two steps on the top and one on the bottom (KFm7).

The purpose of the step, it is claimed, is to allow some of the displaced air to fall into a pocket behind the step and become part of the airfoil shape as a trapped vortex or vortex attachment. This purportedly prevents separation and maintains airflow over the surface of the airfoil.

Reception

Time published an April 2, 1973 article, The Paper-Plane Caper, about the paper airplane and its Kline–Fogleman airfoil.

Also in 1973, CBS 60 Minutes did a 15-minute segment on the KF airfoil. CBS reran the show in 1976.

In 1985, Kline wrote a book entitled The Ultimate Paper Airplane. A crew from Good Morning America filmed the event. The longest flight by Kline with his paper airplane traveled .

Independent scientific testing 

In 1974, a NASA-funded study prompted by Kline and Fogelman's claims and the resulting national coverage found the airfoil to have worse lift-to-drag ratio than a flat plate airfoil in wind tunnel tests.

In the 1990s, after the original patents expired, researchers returned to the topic of stepped wings. A 1998 study by Fathi Finaish and Stephen Witherspoon at the University of Missouri tested numerous step configurations in a wind tunnel.  While many step configurations made wing performance worse, promising results were achieved with backward-facing steps on the lower surface of the wing, in some cases showing considerable enhancement in lift without a significant drag penalty. However, the researchers found that a single configuration could not be the best solution at every angle of attack and flight speed; instead, they concluded that "vastly different configurations may be needed during a single maneuver."  The idea works, Finaish and Witherspoon concluded, but only with active automated reconfiguration of the shape of the steps during flight.
A 2008 study by Fabrizio De Gregorio and Giuseppe Fraioli at CIRA and the University of Rome in Italy pursued this idea further. The model aerofoils used in their wind tunnel tests were equipped with numerous small holes through which air could be blown or sucked in an active way. They concluded that the trapped vortex formed by a cavity or step could not be held in place without such active control. Merely relying passively on wing shape wasn't enough – the vortex would detach, possibly yielding worse characteristics than the original unstepped airfoil. But when active controls were used to keep the vortex stably in place they found the results "really encouraging".

The case study conducted as a part of this research focused on the UAV RQ-2 Pioneer employed in a stepped airfoil configuration by comparing its aerodynamic characteristics with the conventional NACA 4415 airfoil originally used on this aircraft. The main objective of the case study was to identify and outline a step schedule for the flight envelope of the UAV Pioneer using a stepped airfoil configuration at the same time applying active flow control to obtain enhanced aerodynamic performance over conventional NACA 4415 airfoil originally used and hence improve the flight performance characteristics like Range and Endurance of the aircraft.

Applications of the KF airfoil today

Poor lift-to-drag ratio performance in wind tunnel testing has meant that to date the KF airfoil has not been used on any full size aircraft. But the KF airfoil and derivative 'stepped' airfoils have in recent years gained a following in the world of foam constructed radio controlled model aircraft. The low Reynolds numbers allow for the stepped airfoils to produce a significant amount of lift for the drag incurred, making them increasingly popular among RC hobbyists.

The simple KF airfoil shape lends itself well to construction in sheets of various plastic foams, typically expanded polystyrene (EPS) or expanded polypropylene (EPP). The resulting stepped wing can have improved performance and flying characteristics compared to the simpler 'flat plate' wing used in some radio-controlled models. The airfoils illustrated in this article are examples of those used in radio control foam models.

The first-man carrying KF airfoil based aircraft was successfully flown in 1987 by Richard Wood in Canada. (The Recreational Flyer Magazine November December 1991) Top speed was higher and stall was slower (The Recreational Flyer Magazine. November / December 1991). The airfoil was tested on a Vector 600 ultralight. 

The KF airfoil has been applied to the Darrieus wind turbine using a trapped vortex. Experiments have found the KF rotor demonstrates a higher static and dynamic torque with low Reynolds applications and better performance for wind conditions lower than 0.8 m/s. It is seen a potential solution for self-starting in the Darrieus wind turbine.

The first man carrying flight of the Kline Fogelman airfoil was July 7, 1987. in Essex Ontario Canada by Richard (Dick) Wood. This is the first and only known attempt of putting this airfoil on a full sized aircraft. After discussion with the inventor Dick Kline it was decided to have 2 notches per wing. This led to a beneficial side effect for the wing of keeping the airflow attached to the wing at high angles of attack.. The Vector 600 Ultralight was recovered in aircraft fabric and had the notches built in but covered over. First flights were conducted with the notches covered over to produce a regular air foil. Subsequent flights had the notches cut open and exposed. An increase in top speed and a lower stall speed were noted. Regular flight did not seem affected. https://www.youtube.com/watch?v=A1zy57S5DUQ

Patents
 AIRFOIL FOR AIRCRAFT, filed March 17, 1970, issued December 1972
 Airfoil for aircraft having improved lift generating device, filed October 14, 1975, issued September 6, 1977

See also 
 Lift (force)
 Plasma actuator
 Radio-controlled glider
 Simple Plastic Airplane Design
 Wing

References

External links
 KF Airfoil Testing
 YouTube videos of enthusiasts building and flying KF airfoil-based craft
 Interview with Richard Kline about how he came up with the design
 Pictures of aircraft using the KF airfoil
 Fancy Flights, by Scott Morris, a 1984 Omni article about US research into the KF airfoil

Aerodynamics
Aircraft wing design
https://engineeringjournals.stmjournals.in/index.php/JoMA/article/view/3639

2022 DARRIEUS VERTICAL AXIS WIND TURBINE

Design and multiperspectivity-based performance investigations of H-Darrieus vertical axis wind turbine through computational fluid dynamics adopted with moving reference frame approaches | International Journal of Low-Carbon Technologies | Oxford Academic

The enforced flatback airfoils are based on Kline–Fogleman airfoils, which have been subdivided into 12 sub-classifications on the inside. The Kline–Fogleman airfoil, sometimes known as the KF airfoil, is a basic airfoil with one or more steps along the length of the wing. In the early 1960s, a series of KF airfoils were constructed and used in paper planes for the first time. Because of their simple design, high climb and wind resistance, they are now widely used in remotely flown planes. Because the design profiles of basic and advanced airfoils are comparable, this study has been performed to undertake extensive investigations of the two types of airfoils. Computational fluid dynamics (CFD) is the suggested approach for studying the performance of various HDVAWT design profiles. CFD is a versatile approach for dealing with a wide range of difficult problems since it depends significantly on computer systems to solve forced real-time challenges. ANSYS Workbench 17.2 has been used to execute 3D numerical simulations for all of the proposed design airfoils, including the NACA 0018 airfoil and a series of Kline–Fogleman modified NACA 0018 airfoils. This was done to boost the power production and efficiency of the Darrieus VAWT using an H-rotor.

In comparison to the NACA 0018 airfoil, the KFm3 airfoil with 12% step thickness and a rectangular trailing edge demonstrated a 47% efficiency under 6.65 m/s wind velocity and a rotational velocity of 120 RPM. The KFm3 airfoil also performed better when tested at 80 and 162 RPMs. Thus, the final HDVAWT has been presented for real-time applications, which is the primary goal of this work; also, the proposed HDVAWT outperforms all existing vertical axis wind turbines.

. Models 6 and 7 are the top performers in this comprehensive investigation. Model 6 outperforms the standard model by 13.96%, whereas Model 7 outperforms the base model by 47.04%. As a result, it is proposed that Model 7 (best model) is superior to other models, and the same model is finalized as a better wind energy extractor and acceptable model for real-time implementations. The suggested seventh model-based HDVAWT performs better than the traditional and other proposed models. In this extensive examination, numerous working circumstances are implemented, and it was discovered that the seventh model is absolutely ready for deployment.

https://academic.oup.com/ijlct/article/doi/10.1093/ijlct/ctac055/6590200

image0.png